Rain on Lens is the ninth studio album by Smog. It was released on September 17, 2001, in Europe by Domino Recording Company and a day later in North America by Drag City.

Critical reception

At Metacritic, which assigns a weighted average score out of 100 to reviews from mainstream critics, the album received an average score of 73, based on 14 reviews, indicating "generally favorable reviews.

Track listing

Personnel
Credits adapted from liner notes.

 Bill Callahan – vocals, guitar, production, etc.
 Rick Rizzo – guitar
 Geoff Greenberg – bass guitar
 Jessica Billey – violin, backing vocals
 Kyle Bruckmann – English horn, oboe
 Nate Lepine – alto saxophone, flute
 Pat Samson – drums
 Rob Bochnik – recording
 Jeremy Lemos – recording (5, 7)

References

External links
 

2001 albums
Bill Callahan (musician) albums
Drag City (record label) albums
Domino Recording Company albums